The 2015 Argentine Republic motorcycle Grand Prix was the third round of the 2015 Grand Prix motorcycle racing season. It was held at the Autódromo Termas de Río Hondo in Santiago del Estero on 19 April 2015.

In the MotoGP class, Marc Márquez took his second pole position of the season. In the race, he started well and pulled away from the field to a maximum advantage of 4 seconds. However, Valentino Rossi closed in on Márquez, and on lap 22, immediately followed him. At Turn 5, Márquez made contact with Rossi, with Márquez's bike hitting Rossi's rear tyre. Márquez could not rejoin, and as a result, Rossi took his second win of the season. Andrea Dovizioso took his third successive second place, while Cal Crutchlow took LCR Honda's first podium since the 2013 United States Grand Prix with third place, after passing Andrea Iannone at the final corner. Crutchlow's teammate Jack Miller took his first win in the Open category with a twelfth-place finish, and aside from Márquez's retirement, Hiroshi Aoyama and Yonny Hernández were the only other riders not to make the finish.

Classification

MotoGP

Moto2

Moto3

Championship standings after the race (MotoGP)
Below are the standings for the top five riders and constructors after round three has concluded.

Riders' Championship standings

Constructors' Championship standings

Teams' Championship standings

 Note: Only the top five positions are included for all sets of standings.

References

Argentine
Motorcycle Grand Prix
Argentine Republic motorcycle Grand Prix
Argentine Republic motorcycle Grand Prix